The history of Associazione Sportiva Gualdo Calcio has covered 93 years of the football from the club based in Gualdo Tadino, Umbria.

From S.S. Gualdo to A.S. Gualdo

S.S. Gualdo 
The club was founded in 1920 as Società Sportiva Gualdo and made several appearances in professional football, reaching the Serie C1 promotion playoffs twice, in 1995 and 1998. In 1995 the club narrowly missed promotion losing the promotion playoff final on penalty shootouts to Avellino.

A.S. Gualdo 
The club was dropped by the federation because of financial troubles in 2006, after a season in the Serie C2/B; a new club, A.S. Gualdo Calcio, was subsequently admitted to Promozione (7th level of Italian football) and immediately won it, being therefore promoted to Eccellenza for the season 2007–08.

Colors and badge 
The team's colors were red and white.

Honours
Best placement: 3rd, Serie C1/B, 1994–95
Highest home attendance: 4,500: vs Trapani, 1995-06-18; vs Nocerina, 1998-06-07

Notable former players

Notable former managers
 Alberto Cavasin
 Walter Novellino
 Giuliano Sonzogni
 Agatino Cuttone
 Paolo Beruatto

Merger with A.S.D. Casacastalda
In the summer 2013 A.S. Gualdo that played in Eccellenza was merged with A.S.D. Casacastalda, club of serie D of Casacastalda, a frazione of Valfabbrica, using its old sports title, founding the new club of A.S. Gualdo Casacastalda.

References

Gualdo